This list of invasive plant species in Wisconsin includes non-native plant species or strains "that become established in natural plant communities and wild areas, replacing native vegetation".

The Invasive Plants Association of Wisconsin (IPAW) is a group working to address the problems presented by invasive species in Wisconsin. In Wisconsin it is illegal to "possess, transport, transfer, or introduce certain invasive species in Wisconsin without a permit".

Species on IPAW's list of invasive plants:

Acer platanoides – Norway maple
Alliaria petiolata – garlic mustard
Arctium minus – common burdock
Berberis thunbergii – Japanese barberry
Bromus inermis – smooth brome
Campanula rapunculoides – creeping bellflower
Celastrus orbiculatus – Oriental bittersweet
Centaurea maculosa – spotted knapweed
Cirsium arvense – Canada thistle
Convallaria majalis – lily of the valley
Convolvulus arvensis – field bindweed
Crepis tectorum – hawksbeard
Daucus carota – Queen Anne's lace
Dipsacus laciniatus – cut-leaved teasel
Dipsacus sylvestris – common teasel
Elaeagnus angustifolia – Russian olive
Elaeagnus umbellata – autumn olive
Elytrigia repens – quackgrass
Epipactis helleborine – helleborine orchid
Euphorbia cyparissias – cypress spurge
Euphorbia esula – leafy spurge
Festuca arundinacea – tall fescue
Glechoma hederacea – creeping Charlie
Hemerocallis fulva – orange daylily
Hesperis matronalis – dame's rocket
Hieracium aurantiacum – orange hawkweed
Hieracium caespitosum – yellow hawkweed
Hypericum perforatum – St. John's wort
Iris pseudacorus – yellow iris
Leonurus cardiaca – motherwort
Lonicera maackii – Amur honeysuckle
Lonicera morrowii – Morrow's honeysuckle
Lonicera tatarica – Tartarian honeysuckle
Lonicera × bella – Bell's honeysuckle
Lotus corniculatus – bird's-foot trefoil
Lysimachia nummularia – moneywort
Lythrum salicaria – purple loosestrife
Melilotus alba – white sweet clover
Melilotus officinalis – yellow sweet clover
Morus alba – white mulberry
Myosotis scorpioides – forget-me-not
Myriophyllum spicatum – Eurasian watermilfoil
Pastinaca sativa – wild parsnip
Phalaris arundinacea – reed canary grass
Phragmites australis – common reed grass
Pinus sylvestris – Scots pine
Poa compressa – Canada bluegrass
Poa pratensis – Kentucky bluegrass
Populus alba – white poplar
Potamogeton crispus – curly-leaf pondweed
Reynoutria japonica (syn. Polygonum cuspidatum) – Japanese knotweed
Rhamnus cathartica – common buckthorn
Rhamnus frangula – glossy buckthorn
Robinia pseudoacacia – black locust
Rosa multiflora – multiflora rose
Rumex acetosella – sheep sorrel
Saponaria officinalis – soapwort
Securigera varia – crown vetch
Solanum dulcamara – climbing nightshade
Tanacetum vulgare – tansy
Trifolium pratense – red clover
Trifolium repens – white clover
Typha angustifolia – narrow-leaved cattail
Typha × glauca – hybrid cattail
Ulmus pumila – Siberian elm
Vinca minor – common periwinkle

References

Environment of Wisconsin
Wisconsin
Invasive plant